Saitis insectus is a species of spider in the genus Saitis and the family, Salticidae. It is found in central Australia.

Taxonomy

Saitis insectus was first described in 1896 by Henry Roughton Hogg as Prostheclina insecta It was transferred to the genus, Saitis in 1911 by William Joseph Rainbow (as Saitis insecta). Hogg' describes a female spider, (K946) collected from Rudall's Creek in the Northern Territory in 1894.

References

insectus
Endemic fauna of Australia
Spiders of Oceania
Spiders described in 1896